Vainon Shanon Willis (born 11 October 1988) is a retired South African rugby union player, who most recently played with the . His regular position is winger.

Career

Youth level
He represented  at youth level between 2004 (at the Under-16 Grant Khomo Week) and 2009 (in the Under-21 Provincial Championship competition).

Provincial Rugby

Varsity Cup

Representative Rugby
Willis played for S.A. Schools teams in 2005 and 2006, South Africa Under-19 in 2007 and South Africa Under-20 in the inaugural IRB Junior World Championship in 2008. In 2013, he was also named in a South African Barbarians team to face Saracens.

References

South African rugby union players
Living people
1988 births
Blue Bulls players
Boland Cavaliers players
Golden Lions players
Leopards (rugby union) players
Pumas (Currie Cup) players
Rugby union players from Cape Town
Rugby union wings
South Africa Under-20 international rugby union players
Tshwane University of Technology alumni